The Unwritten Law is an extant 1925 silent film crime melodrama directed by Edward LeSaint and starring Elaine Hammerstein. It was produced and distributed by Columbia Pictures. In the UK distribution was handled by Film Booking Offices of America.

Cast
Elaine Hammerstein - Helen Merritt
Forrest Stanley - Jack Wayne
William V. Mong - Colonel Merritt
Mary Alden - Miss Grant
Charles Clary - John Randall
Johnny Fox - Office Boy
William A. Carroll - Mr. Smart

Preservation status
Prints survive at George Eastman House and The Library of Congress.

References

External links
 The Unwritten Law at IMDb.com

1925 films
American silent feature films
Films directed by Edward LeSaint
Columbia Pictures films
American black-and-white films
American crime drama films
Melodrama films
1925 crime drama films
1920s American films
Silent American drama films